The  Alfred C. and Annie L. Olsen Anderson House, at 8850 South 60 East in Sandy, Utah, was built around 1916.  It was listed on the National Register of Historic Places in 1999.  It is also included in the National Register-listed Sandy Historic District.

It is a one-story buff brick house, with a nearly pyramidal roof.

It was deemed significant as "an interesting example of Sandy's residential architecture in transition during the early twentieth century. The house is essentially a transitional Victorian cottage, displaying the influence of both the bungalow style and Craftsman movement."

Alfred was born near Oslo, Norway;  Annie was from Salt Lake City.

References

National Register of Historic Places in Salt Lake County, Utah
Residential buildings completed in 1916
1916 establishments in Utah